Jyotirmoyee Devi (1894–1988) was an Indian writer in the early twentieth century. She wrote predominantly about women in the Rajasthan of her childhood and in what is now West Bengal at the time of Partition. She is best known for her short stories, which have a wonderfully understated dry wit and sharp sociological observations.

Biography
Devi was born in the Princely State of Jaipur in 1894, where her family had lived since 1857. Her father, Abinash Chandra Sen, was the eldest son of Sansar Chandra Sen who had come to Jaipur as a schoolmaster but quickly rose to the post of Dewan to the Maharaja of Jaipur. Devi grew up in Jaipur, receiving little formal education but observing keenly all that she saw around her. She was much impressed by the mixture of decadence and splendour that characterised the society of the zenana (women’s quarters) in a princely state of the time. Devi was allowed to read whatever she liked in her grandfather’s well-stocked library and thus acquired a rather eclectic exposure to the world. At the age of 10, she was married to a lawyer, Kiran Chandra Sen, from a literary and aristocratic family from Guptipara, who were well known to many of the leading figures of Bengali literature.

Devi might never have written had she not tragically lost her husband in 1918 due to influenza. Barely 25 years old, with six small children (Amia, Anubha, Arun Chandra, Asoka, Amitava, and Anjuli), she returned to her parents' house, leaving one child with her husband’s family. There she lived under the rigid rules of orthodox Hindu widowhood, rules which she continued to observe punctiliously even though she began to question their basis. In her abandonment, Devi turned to literature for solace. She read John Stuart Mill’s On the Subjection of Women which she received from her grandfather, and this led her to think deeply on the question of women’s rights. Conservative in her own behaviour, she nevertheless made it a rule always to treat her sons and daughters equally. She now began to write the trenchant, luminous Bengali short stories for which she is remembered. Set in Rajasthan, Delhi, and Bengal, they are unsentimental yet deeply sympathetic, richly detailed yet intellectually limpid. She also wrote non-fiction, writing especially about the rights of women and Dalits. Her collection of short stories, Sona Rupa Noy (Not Gold and Silver) won the Rabindra Puraskar in 1973. From 1959 to 1988 she resided in the Shyambazar area at 2G, Kartick Bose Lane, Kolkata-700006.

Style
Her poems as well as her stories are written so that anyone and everyone can understand them. Yet the message conveyed was as strong as a brick. No use of sophisticated vocabulary is a great feature of her writing, also practised by Swami Vivekananda in his speeches. Her writing is based on real life experience and learning. She might not have been formally educated but that was no wall to her writing. A great inspiration for anyone wanting to write but is not confident about doing so.

Books
Her books are available in various stores in Kolkata as well as other places. The short story, Daini, is part of the Bengali syllabus of Indian Certificate of Secondary Education. Her daughter Asoka was in charge of her books but died in June, 2008. Much of her work has been translated by Barnita Bagchi.

A translation by Apala G. Egan of her story The Princess Baby appeared in J Journal: New Writing on Justice (Spring 2014).

Documentary
Director Raja Sen made a documentary on Jyotirmoyee Devi as a tribute on her Centennial.

Bibliography
 Jyotirmoyee Devi, Epar Ganga, Opar Ganga (1968),  The River Churning: A Partition Novel (New Delhi: Kali for Women, 1995) from Bengali by Enakshi Chatterjee
 Jyotirmoyee Devi, The Impermanence of Lies (Calcutta: Stree, 1999) with Introduction by Mahasweta Devi

References

External links
 Documentary on Jyotirmoyee Devi by Raja Sen on YouTube in 3 parts, 44 min total

Indian women short story writers
1894 births
1988 deaths
Writers from Jaipur
20th-century Indian short story writers
20th-century Indian women writers
Women writers from Rajasthan
Poets from Rajasthan
Indian women poets
20th-century Indian poets
 Writers from Kolkata